Julian Fletcher (born 8 October 1990) is a Bermudian swimmer. He competed in the men's 100 metre breaststroke event at the 2016 Summer Olympics, where he ranked 40th with a time of 1:02.73. He did not advance to the final.

References

External links
 

1990 births
Living people
Bermudian male swimmers
Olympic swimmers of Bermuda
Swimmers at the 2016 Summer Olympics
Place of birth missing (living people)
Pan American Games competitors for Bermuda
Swimmers at the 2015 Pan American Games
Commonwealth Games competitors for Bermuda
Swimmers at the 2014 Commonwealth Games
Male breaststroke swimmers